Tafsir Anwar ul Bayan is a five volume commentary (exegesis) on the Quran that was written by Ashiq Elahi Bulandshahri. It was written in Urdu.

Background about author 

Ashiq Elahi Bulandshahri was a scholar who died in Madina Munawwara. He was a disciple of Muhammad Zakariyya Kandhlawi. He stayed in Madina  for almost two decades and dedicated his life to the teachings of Quran and sunnah. He also taught in various educational institutes and madaris in India and Pakistan.

Translations 
"It has been ably translated into English in South Africa by Maulana Ismail Ebrahim, and edited by Ismail Khathrada and Mufti Afzal Hoosen Elias."

English translation is titled as "The Illuminating Discourses of the Noble Quran"

See also 

 Tafsir al-Tabari by Muhammad ibn Jarir al-Tabari
 Tafsir ibn Kathir by Ibn Kathir (1301-1373 CE/ 747 AH).
 Ma'alim al-Tanzil by Hasan bin Mas'ud al-Baghawi

References

External links 
Multi-lingual Tafsir Collections at Australian Islamic Library (online)
Tafsir Anwar ul Bayan (Urdu) 
Tafsir Anwar ul Bayan (English)

Islamic texts
Islamic theology books
Deobandi literature

Tafsir works
Sunni tafsir
Indian religious texts
Indian non-fiction books
20th-century Indian books
Urdu-language books